The White Bay Cruise Terminal is a terminal for cruise ships on Sydney Harbour. The terminal is located at the eastern end of the White Bay wharves, on the northern shore of White Bay. It opened on 15 April 2013 as a replacement for Wharf 8 on Darling Harbour which closed to make way for the Barangaroo development.

The terminal building was constructed within and amongst a twin-beam gantry structure originally constructed in the 1960s for gantry cranes for container use. In October 2013 it won the transport section at the World Architecture Festival. The Overseas Passenger Terminal remains as Sydney's primary terminal, with the White Bay Cruise Terminal only taking those vessels which can fit under the Sydney Harbour Bridge.

When the terminal is occupied, Captain Cook Cruises operate a ferry service to Barangaroo.

A 2017 study into implementing shore power at the White Bay Cruise Terminal estimated the implementation cost to be $36million causing the NSW State Government to rule out implementing it. On 21March 2022 it was announced that approximately $60million would be spent to enable shore power at the terminal from 2024.

References

Buildings and structures completed in 2013
Buildings and structures in Sydney
Passenger ship terminals
Ports and harbours of New South Wales
Sydney Harbour
Wharves in Australia
2013 establishments in Australia